Øyangen is a lake in the municipality of Ringerike in Buskerud county, Norway. The lake is located in  Nordmarka, a large wooded area north of Oslo. Fishing is popular with the lake offering perch, trout and char.

See also
List of lakes in Norway

References

Lakes of Viken (county)